Alioune Badará Samb (born 1 October 1989) is a Senegalese footballer who plays as a forward for Montalegre on loan from Vitória Setúbal.

Club career
After playing youth football for Senegalese academy Étoile Lusitana, Badará spent 9 years of his career with several clubs in Portugal.

On 20 July 2017, Badará signed a two year contract with Bulgarian club Etar Veliko Tarnovo. On 7 August 2017, he made his debut in a 0–0 away draw against Dunav Ruse, coming on as substitute for Ivan Petkov.

On 10 September 2019, Badará signed a contract with Oman Professional League team, Sohar. 

In October 2020, he joined Portuguese club União Leiria.

References

External links
 
 

1989 births
Living people
Footballers from Dakar
Senegalese footballers
Moreirense F.C. players
F.C. Famalicão players
GD Bragança players
AD Fafe players
SC Vianense players
C.D.C. Montalegre players
Amarante F.C. players
SFC Etar Veliko Tarnovo players
Alki Oroklini players
Sohar SC players
Al-Arabi SC (UAE) players
U.D. Leiria players
Campeonato de Portugal (league) players
First Professional Football League (Bulgaria) players
Senegalese expatriate footballers
Senegalese expatriate sportspeople in Portugal
Senegalese expatriate sportspeople in Bulgaria
Senegalese expatriate sportspeople in Cyprus
Senegalese expatriate sportspeople in Oman
Senegalese expatriate sportspeople in the United Arab Emirates
Expatriate footballers in Portugal
Expatriate footballers in Bulgaria
Expatriate footballers in Cyprus
Expatriate footballers in Oman
Expatriate footballers in the United Arab Emirates
Association football forwards